The Rogue River Range is a mountain range in Jackson County, Oregon.

References 

Mountain ranges of Oregon
Mountain ranges of Jackson County, Oregon